Plestiodon elegans, the five-striped blue-tailed skink or Shanghai elegant skink, is a species of lizards in the genus Plestiodon found in East Asia.

References 

 Selected body temperature, thermal tolerance and thermal dependence of food assimilation and locomotor performance in adult blue-tailed skinks, Eumeces elegans. WG Du, SJ Yan, X Ji, Journal of Thermal Biology, 2000
 Growth, sexual size dimorphism and female reproduction of blue tailed skinks, Eumeces elegans. DU Wei-Guo, JI Xiang, Zoological Research, 2001

External links 
 
 

elegans
Vertebrates of East Asia
Lizards of Asia
Reptiles of Hong Kong
Reptiles described in 1887
Taxa named by George Albert Boulenger